The Dinomyidae are a family  of South American hystricognath rodents: the dinomyids were once a very speciose group, but now contains only a single living species, the pacarana. Several of the extinct dinomyids were among the largest rodents known to date; these included the bison-sized Josephoartigasia monesi and the smaller Josephoartigasia magna. The dinomyids are thought to have occupied ecological niches associated with large grazing mammals due to their ability to compete with the native ungulates of South America. On the other side, they could feed on aquatic or swampy plants along the ancient rivers. These large forms disappeared after the formation of a connection to North America.  The modern pacarana is only modest in size, considerably smaller than the capybara.

The Neoepiblemidae, an entirely extinct family, may actually be part of the Dinomyidae; both groups are undoubtedly closely related.

Genera
Family: Dinomyidae
†Agnomys incertae sedis
†Borikenomys - incertae sedis?
†Pseudodiodomus incertae sedis
Subfamily: Dinomyinae
Dinomys - pacarana
†Telodontomys
Subfamily: †Eumegamyinae

†Briaromys
†Colpostemma
†Doellomys
†Eumegamysops
†Eumegamys
†Gyriabrus
†Josephoartigasia
†Orthomys
†Pentastylodon
†Pseudosigmomys
†Telicomys
†Tetrastylus
Subfamily: †Potamarchinae
†Eusigmomys
†Olenopsis
†Potamarchus
†Scleromys
†Simplimus

References

Rodent families
Hystricognath rodents
Extant Miocene first appearances
Taxa named by Wilhelm Peters